Wonnacott is a surname. Notable people with the surname include:

John Wonnacott (born 1940), English painter
Paul Wonnacott (born 1933), American economist and writer
Ronald J. Wonnacott (1930–2018), Canadian economist
Tim Wonnacott (born 1951), English television presenter, auctioneer and antiques expert